Filonovo is a rural locality (a selo) and the administrative center of Filonovskoye Rural Settlement, Bogucharsky District, Voronezh Oblast, Russia. The population was 596 as of 2010. There are 11 streets.

Geography 
Filonovo is located 15 km north of Boguchar (the district's administrative centre) by road. Pereshchepnoye is the nearest rural locality.

References 

Rural localities in Bogucharsky District